William Byron may refer to:

William Byron, 3rd Baron Byron (1636–1695), British peer and great-great-grandfather of poet George Gordon Byron
William Byron, 4th Baron Byron (1669–1736), British peer and great-grandfather of poet George Gordon Byron
William Byron, 5th Baron Byron (1722–1798), British peer and great-uncle of poet George Gordon Byron
William D. Byron (1895–1941), Democratic member of U.S. Congress 1939–1941 from Maryland's 6th congressional district
William Byron (racing driver) (born 1997), American race car driver
William J. Byron (born 1927), priest of the Society of Jesus
Lord Byron (umpire) (1872–1955), American baseball umpire
William Byron (MP) (1749–1776), British politician

See also
William Byron Rumford (1908–1986), California legislator